Baboloki Tirelo Thebe (born 18 March 1997) is a Botswana track and field sprinter who specialises in the 400 metres. He was a silver medallist in the 200 metres at the 2014 Summer Youth Olympics. He reached the semi-finals at the 2014 World Junior Championships in Athletics. He made a breakthrough in the 400 m in May 2016 with a run of 44.22 seconds, placing him third on the global seasonal lists and moving him into the all-time top 30 for the event. He competed at the 2016 Summer Olympics.
His personal best in 400 meters is 44.02, which he ran in July 2017

International competitions

1: Disqualified in the final
2: Disqualified in the semifinals
3: Did not start in the semifinals

References

External links
 

Living people
1997 births
Botswana male sprinters
People from Kgatleng District
Athletes (track and field) at the 2014 Summer Youth Olympics
Athletes (track and field) at the 2016 Summer Olympics
Olympic athletes of Botswana
Athletes (track and field) at the 2018 Commonwealth Games
Athletes (track and field) at the 2019 African Games
World Athletics Championships athletes for Botswana
Commonwealth Games medallists in athletics
Commonwealth Games gold medallists for Botswana
Commonwealth Games silver medallists for Botswana
African Championships in Athletics winners
African Games competitors for Botswana
Athletes (track and field) at the 2020 Summer Olympics
Medalists at the 2020 Summer Olympics
Olympic bronze medalists in athletics (track and field)
Olympic bronze medalists for Botswana
Medallists at the 2018 Commonwealth Games